The Women's Senior Amateur, also known as the Ladies' Senior British Open Amateur Championship, is a golf tournament organised annually by The R&A. The championship is open to players aged 50 years and over, and was first played in 1981. In 2022 the event was played over 72 holes, having previously been over 54 holes, although it was played over 36 holes up to 1995.

In the past 25 years, both Angela Uzielli (1998 and 1999) and Eva Ansgarius (2004 and 2005) have managed to successfully defend their titles. Uzielli won the championship a record six times in the 1990s.

The winner is awarded the Clark Trophy, which was presented to the Ladies Golf Union by Linda Clark.

Winners

Source:

Future venues
2023 - Woodhall Spa
2024 - Saunton

See also
U.S. Senior Women's Amateur
European Senior Ladies' Championship

References

External links

R&A championships
Senior golf tournaments
Amateur golf tournaments in the United Kingdom
Women's golf in the United Kingdom
1981 establishments in England
Recurring sporting events established in 1981